List of motorized trikes is a list of motorized tricycles also called trikes, and sometimes considered cars. There are three typical configurations: motorized bicycle with sidecar; two wheels in the rear, one in the front (aka trike); and two in front, one in the rear (aka reverse trike). However, language and definitions vary.

One of the most successful trikes of its day was the De Dion-Bouton tricycle; from 1897 until the start of the 20th century about 15,000 licensed copies were sold, with De Dion Bouton usually supplying the engines, and it was overall the most popular motor vehicle in Europe. 

Trikes have caused tautological confusion and simply defied typical two and four-wheel classifications, especially in the 21st century. Regardless, many popular motorcycles and/or automobiles had three wheels.

Examples

17th century
Stephan Farffler's trike

18th century

 Cugnot's fardier à vapeur (steam powered)

19th century

 Ariel 2.25 hp tricycle (1898)
 Benz Patent-Motorwagen (Internal combustion engine) (1886–1893)
 Buckeye gasoline buggy (1891)
 De Dion-Bouton tricycle (1897–1905)
 Eadie motor tricycle, (1898-1900) 
 Humber 'Beeston' motor tricycle (1899)
 Léon Bollée Voiturette (1895)
 Long steam tricycle (c. 1880)
 Michaux-Perreaux steam velocipede (1884 Tricycle version)
 Motrice Pia (1894)
 Orient tricycle (1899–1901)
 Star motor tricycle (1899)

20th century

 BSA Ariel 3 (1970–1973)
 BMW R75 (1941–1945) (w. sidecar)
 Brough Superior Austin Four
 Campagna T-Rex (1996–2018)
 CityEl (1987–)
 Coventry-Victor 3-wheeler
 David trike cars (1913–1923)
 De Dion-Bouton tricycle (1897–1905)
 Electricar (1920–1921)
 Fend Flitzer (c. 1948)
 GG Duetto (1994–1999)
 Goliath Goli
 Grinnall Scorpion III (c. 1991)
 Harley-Davidson Servi-Car (1932 to 1973)
 Heinkel Kabine
 HM Vehicles Free-way (1979 to 1982)
 Honda Gyro
 Indian Dispatch-Tow(1930s)
 Indian Tri-Car (circa 1907)(Hendee Manufacturing Co.)
 JZR Trike models
 Krauser Domani
 Lambretta Lambro (1949-1972)
 Lurquin-Coudert (1906–1914)
 Mercedes-Benz F300 Lifejet

 Messerschmitt KR175 (1953–1955) (Messerschmitt Kabinenroller)
 Messerschmitt KR200
 Minneapolis Tri-Car
 Misc Custom Chopper trikes
 Misc. Moto Guzzi Triporteurs
 Morgan 3-Wheeler (pre-war productions)
 Moto Guzzi Trialce
 Corbin Sparrow
 Norton Big 4 (mc w/ sc)
 Peel P50 (minicar) (1962–65)
 Piaggio Ape (1947– )
 Reliant Robin (1973–2002)
 Reliant TW9 (1967–1987)
 Rollfix-Eilwagen
 Scott Sociable

 Sinclair C5 (1985)
 Spirit of America Formula Shell LSRV. (jet engine)
 Tatra 49 (1929–1930)
 Triking (1970s-)
 Twike (TWIKE 1986+)
 Velorex (1950s–1971)
 Utopian (1914)
 Westcoaster Mailster

21st century

 AEV 311 EV
 Ape Calessino 200 (new production)
 Aptera (solar electric vehicle)
 Arcimoto
 Bombardier Can-Am Spyder (2007–)
 Brudeli Leanster 625L
 Carver
 Campagna T-Rex (1996–)
 Campagna V13R
 CityEl (1987–)
Elio E-Series
Elio P models (prototypes)
eTuk USA (2015–)
GG Taurus
Hannigan BMW 1600 Trike
Hannigan Harley-Davidson V-Rod Trike
 Harley-Davidson Street Glide Trike (2010–)
 Harley-Davidson Freewheeler (2015–)
 Harley-Davidson Tri Glide Ultra Classic
 Honda Gyro (tilting)
 IRIS
 JZR Trike models
 Kymco CV3 (2018–)
 MEV TR1KE
 Morgan 3-Wheeler (new production 2010s)
 Myers Motors NmG
 Peel P50 (2010– )
 Peugeot Metropolis 400i
 Piaggio Ape (1947– ), MP3 (2006–)
 Polaris Slingshot
 Quadro 350S three-wheel scooter
 Rewaco RF-1 Trike
 Roadsmith Trikes
 Scorpion P6
 Stimson Sting (2002–2007)
 Tanom Invader TC-3
 Terracraft Supertrike
 Tilting Motor Works Tilting V-Max Trike
 Tokai Challenger
 Toyota i-Road (2013)
 Traverston Striker
 Tri Pod GII by Mynrva (2012-) Bandit 1250, ZX14R based
 Triking
 Trirod F3
 Twisted Trike
 Uno III
 Vanderhall Laguna trike

 Veemo by VeloMetro Mobility – Fully enclosed, pedal-electric trike, regulated as an electric bicycle in North America.
 Venom SS
 Venom X
 Volkswagen GX3 (concept trike)
 Yamaha Niken – trike with the Yamaha MT-09 engine, for European and Asian markets
 Yamaha RX1 snowmobile custom conversion to street trike
 Yamaha Tricity
 ZAP Xebra (2006–2009)
 ZTR Trike

Miscellaneous
Another idea is the flike, a sort of flying motorcycle/helicopter.

Whike are sail-powered trikes, which may or may not be motorized depending if one considers a sail to be a type of motorization. 

There is another arrangement of three-wheel, with the wheels in a line; this is so far pretty rare.

Motorcycles with two sidecars
Motorcycles with sidecars often have three wheels, but there has been some use of two sidecars (one on each side of a motorcycle, not a sidecar that seats two which is another thing). In one case the use of flexible type sidecars allow the center-line motor bicycle wheels to stay on the ground, and providing adequate handling

Gallery

See also

 Motorized tricycle
 Steam tricycle
 Cyclecar
 Three-wheeler (three wheel vehicles including animal, human, or motors)
 Tilting three-wheeler (related to the suspension of the vehicle)
 All-terrain vehicle (ATVs) (variety of wheel number and configurations)
 Go-kart
 Off road go-kart and Dune buggys (typically 4 wheels plus roll cage)
 Chopper (motorcycle)
Motor bicycle related:
 Feet forwards motorcycle
 Scooter (motorcycle)
 Cabin motorcycle
 Velomobile (human-powered car)
 Auto rickshaw (general term that includes many kinds of trike/three-wheelers etc.)
 Types of motorcycles
 Motorcycle motor powered car

References

External links

Trikes
Three-wheeled motor vehicles